Radha (born 1932)  and Jayalakshmi (1932 - 2014), popularly known as Radha Jayalakshmi, were an Indian Carnatic music vocalist duo as well as playback singers in films in the 1940s and 1950s. They later became teachers and trained notable Carnatic music singers. Jayalakshmi was the playback singer of the duo, but was credited as Radha Jayalakshmi in the cine field. Radha was her cousin and singing partner on stage performances. They were early vocalists in the duo singing trend in Carnatic music which started in the 1950s and includes performers like Bombay Sisters and Soolamangalam Sisters. In recent times, the trend has been continued by popular Carnatic music singers like Priya Sisters, their disciples, Ranjani Gayatri, Akkarai sisters, and others.

The duo was awarded the 1981 Sangeet Natak Akademi Award in Carnatic Music – Vocal, given by the Sangeet Natak Akademi, India's National Academy for Music, Dance and Drama
Vidushi Jayalakshmi died in Chennai on 27 May 2014.

Early life and training

Radha and Jayalakshmi's singing style belongs to the G. N. Balasubramaniam school, and they received their training in classical vocal music from the noted vocalist and teacher himself.

Career
Jayalakshmi has rendered songs in her trained, cultured and 'ringing' sweet voice in Tamil, Malayalam, Telugu and Kannada movies from the late 1940s to the early 60s.

She also has a few playback singing credits from the 1970s.

In Deivam, Kunnakkudi Vaidyanathan had both Radha and Jayalakshmi render Thiruchendooril Por Purindhu, a devotional song set in Thiruthani. This is perhaps the only film song sung by Radha of the duo. But both have given stage performances throughout India.

The singers had no longer been giving performances towards the time of Jayalakshmi's death, but instead had shifted their efforts to teaching Carnatic music and were regarded as great teachers. Shanmukhapriya and Haripriya, popularly known as the Priya Sisters, were their students.

Music composers Jayalakshmi sang for 
Jayalakshmi's most memorable songs date from the 50s films.

Playback singers Jayalakshmi sang with
Jayalakshmi was often paired to sing with the male singers T. M. Soundararajan, Seerkazhi Govindarajan and A. M. Rajah. Other male singers she sang with include T. A. Mothi, Ghantasala, S. Balachander, Thiruchi Loganathan, K. Prasad Rao, V. N. Sundaram, Subrahmanyam and Pithapuram Nageswara Rao.

She also sang duets with female singers, most notably with P. Leela and Soolamangalam Rajalakshmi. Others are M. L. Vasanthakumari, P. A. Periyanayaki, N. L. Ganasaraswathi, A. P. Komala, T. V. Rathnam, M. S. Rajeswari, S. Janaki, K. Rani and Jikki.

The singing actors she sang with were K. R. Ramasamy and S. Varalakshmi.

Death
Jayalakshmi of the duo, died, aged 82, in Chennai on 26 May 2014.

Filmography

References

External links
 Radha Jayalakshmi at last.fm
 Radha Jayalakshmi songs
 Reliving Beautiful Moments with Vidushis Radha Jayalakshmi, 1962 on Friday, April 27, 2012

Women Carnatic singers
Carnatic singers
Indian women playback singers
Malayalam playback singers
Indian musical duos
Recipients of the Sangeet Natak Akademi Award
Voice teachers
Tamil playback singers
Tamil singers
Sibling musical duos
Indian women classical singers
20th-century Indian singers
Indian music educators
Telugu playback singers
20th-century Indian educators
20th-century Indian women singers
Women music educators
20th-century women educators